Kevin Gibbens (born 4 November 1979) is an English former professional footballer who played as a midfielder.

Playing career

Southampton
Gibbens made his debut for Southampton on 4 April 1998 against Sheffield Wednesday, coming on in the 58th minute for Matt Le Tissier.

Sholing
Gibbens joined Sholing (then VTFC) in August 2004, staying at the club for eight years.

Blackfield & Langley
Gibbens joined Wessex League side Blackfield & Langley in July 2012.

Andover Town
After leaving Blackfield, Gibbens signed for Andover Town in August 2015.

Managerial career
On 17 December 2013, it was announced that Gibbens was to become player-manager of Blackfield & Langley, following the departure of Glenn Burnett.

References

External links
Kevin Gibbens Basingstoke Town Profile
Kevin Gibbens Wessex League Profile

Since 1888... The Searchable Premiership and Football League Player Database (subscription required)
Sporting-heroes.net

1979 births
Living people
Footballers from Southampton
English footballers
Association football midfielders
Southampton F.C. players
Stockport County F.C. players
Oxford United F.C. players
Basingstoke Town F.C. players
Sholing F.C. players
Blackfield & Langley F.C. players
Andover Town F.C. players
Premier League players
English Football League players
English football managers
Blackfield & Langley F.C. managers
Wessex Football League players